Francisco Romero may refer to:

Francisco García Romero (1559–1630s), Spanish military officer
Francisco Romero (bishop) (died 1635), served as archbishop in Italy
Francisco Romero (bullfighter) (1700–1763), Spanish matador
Francisco Romero (philosopher) (1891–1962), Latin American philosopher
Francisco Romero (surgeon), Spanish surgeon
Francisco Romero (mayor), interim mayor of Ponce, Puerto Rico